The Boğsak Tunnel is a road tunnel located in Silifke, Mersin Province in southern Turkey as part of the highway .

The highway  is the main route running all the way from west to east in southern Turkey. Toros Mountains, which run in parallel to Mediterranean Sea coast, are to the north of the highway. The mountain range meets occasionally the sea with a high-sloped coast. Particularly, the  portion of the highway connecting the two major Mediterranean ports of Antalya and Mersin is known for its steep ramps and sharp curves in the mountainous area. One of the most problematic courses up to date was a -course between Boğsak in the east and Akdere in the west, which was called the Çile yolu (literally: Road of ordeal) by the drivers.

The tunnel was constructed to ease the traffic in this course. It was opened on 18 March 2014.

It is a -long twin-tube tunnel carrying two lanes of traffic in each direction. The tunnel is equipped with illumination, ventilation, intercommunication and other modern facilities. The construction of the tunnel cost 65 million.

References

Road tunnels in Turkey
Transport in Mersin Province
Tunnels completed in 2014
Silifke District
2014 establishments in Turkey